The 42nd Field Artillery Regiment is a field artillery regiment of the United States Army, first Constituted 5 July 1918 in the National Army (USA).

Lineage
Constituted 29 June 1918 in the Regular Army as the 1st Battalion, 42d Artillery (Coast Artillery Corps)

Organized 7 August 1918 in France

Inactivated 17 August 1921 at Camp Eustis, Virginia

Redesignated 1 July 1924 as the 1st Battalion, 42d Coast Artillery

Disbanded 14 June 1944

Reconstituted 28 June 1950 in the Regular Army; concurrently consolidated with the 42d Field Artillery Battalion (active) (see ANNEX) and consolidated unit designated as the 42d Field Artillery Battalion, an element of the 4th Infantry Division

Relieved 1 April 1957 from assignment to the 4th Infantry Division; concurrently reorganized and redesignated as the 42d Artillery, a parent regiment under the Combat Arms Regimental System

Redesignated 1 September 1971 as the 42d Field Artillery

Withdrawn 15 January 1996 from the Combat Arms Regimental System and reorganized under the United States Army Regimental System

ANNEX

Constituted 5 July 1918 in the National Army as the 42d Field Artillery and assigned to the 14th Division

Organized 10 August 1918 at Camp Custer, Michigan

Demobilized 7 February 1919 at Camp Custer, Michigan

Reconstituted 1 October 1933 in the Regular Army as the 42d Field Artillery

Redesignated 1 October 1940 as the 42d Field Artillery Battalion, assigned to the 4th Division (later redesignated as the 4th Infantry Division), and activated at Fort Benning, Georgia

Inactivated 16 February 1946 at Camp Butner, North Carolina

Activated 15 July 1947 at Fort Ord, California

Distinctive unit insignia
Description
A Gold color metal and enamel device 1 1/16 inches (2.70 cm) in height overall consisting of a shield blazoned: Gules, two bendlets between four shells, two in chief and two in base, all Or. Attached below the shield a Gold scroll inscribed “FESTINA LENTE” in Black letters.
Symbolism
Scarlet is the color used for Artillery. The shells indicate the nature of the organization and with the bendlets produce the numerical designation of the organization.
Background
The distinctive unit insignia was originally approved for the 42d Field Artillery Battalion on 7 May 1942. It was redesignated for the 42d Artillery Regiment on 26 November 1958. The insignia was redesignated for the 42d Field Artillery Regiment effective 1 September 1971.

Coat of arms
Blazon
Shield: Gules, two bendlets between four shells, two in chief and two in base, all Or.
Crest: On a wreath of the colors Or and Gules a dexter hand grasping four spears pointing in four directions of the compass Or.
Motto: FESTINA LENTE (Make Haste Slowly).
Symbolism
Shield:,Scarlet is the color used for Artillery. The shells indicate the nature of the organization and with the bendlets produce the numerical designation of the organization.
Crest:,The hand grasping the spears indicates firepower in any direction.
Background:,The coat of arms was originally approved for the 42d Field Artillery Battalion on 7 May 1942. It was redesignated for the 42d Artillery Regiment on 26 November 1958. The insignia was redesignated for the 42d Field Artillery Regiment effective 1 September 1971.

Current configuration
 1st Battalion 42nd Field Artillery Regiment (United States)
 2nd Battalion 42nd Field Artillery Regiment (United States)
 3rd Battalion 42nd Field Artillery Regiment (United States)
 4th Battalion 42nd Field Artillery Regiment (United States) 
 5th Battalion 42nd Field Artillery Regiment (United States)
 6th Battalion 42nd Field Artillery Regiment (United States)

Campaign participation credit

World War I: Alsace 1918
World War II: Normandy (with arrowhead); Northern France; Rhineland; Ardennes-Alsace; Central Europe
Vietnam: Counteroffensive, Phase II; Counteroffensive, Phase III; Tet Counteroffensive; Counteroffensive, Phase IV; Counteroffensive, Phase V; Counteroffensive, Phase VI; Tet 69/Counteroffensive; Summer-Fall 1969; Winter-Spring 1970; Sanctuary Counteroffensive; Counteroffensive, Phase VII; Consolidation I; Consolidation II; Cease-Fire
 Operation Iraqi Freedom: Liberation of Iraq, 2003; Transition of Iraq, 2003-2004; Iraqi Governance, 2004-2005; National Resolution, 2005-2006; Iraqi Surge, 2007-2008; Iraqi Sovereignty, 2009-2010
 Operation Enduring Freedom (Afghanistan): Consolidation III, 2010-2011; Transition I, 2011-2011

Decorations

 Presidential Unit Citation (Army), Streamer embroidered LUXEMBOURG (42nd Field Artillery Battalion cited; WD GO 30, 1946)
 Valorous Unit Award for service in Iraq during Operation Red Dawn (Capture of Saddam Hussein) (DA GO 2009–11 16 December 2009)
 Valorous Unit Award for service in Iraq (OIF 07-09) (DA GO 2010–16–3 September 2010)
 Meritorious Unit Commendation for service in Iraq (PO 208-26, 27 July 2009)
 Meritorious Unit Commendation for service in Afghanistan (OEF 10-11) (PO 202-15, 21 July 2011)
 Army Superior Unit Award for successful participation in the Army's Advanced Warfighting Experiment; March 1997 (DA GO 0125 June 2001)
 Belgian Fourragère 1940 (42nd Field Artillery Battalion cited; DA GO 43, 1950)
 Cited in the Order of the Day of the Belgian Army for action in BELGIUM (42nd Field Artillery Battalion cited; DA GO 43, 1950)

See also
 Field Artillery Branch (United States)

References

 https://web.archive.org/web/20110722214111/http://www.tioh.hqda.pentagon.mil/Heraldry/ArmyDUISSICOA/ArmyHeraldryUnit.aspx?u=3446

External links
 http://www.history.army.mil/html/forcestruc/lineages/branches/fa/default.htm

042
Field artillery
Military units and formations established in 1918
1918 establishments in Michigan